Fur Rondy has been held in Anchorage, Alaska during the late winter since 1950. It is a celebration of the time when trappers would return to the city to gather and share stories, sell their furs and antlers, and to socialize. It also commemorates the start of the Iditarod.  One part of Fur Rondy is the Miners and Trappers Ball, which is a fundraiser for the Lions Club's of Alaska.  The Miners and Trappers Ball has a yearly theme focused on one part of Alaskan life.  The highlight of the Miners and Trappers Ball is the Mr. Fur Face beard contest.  The contest is sponsored by the South central Alaska Beard and Mustache Club.

Contest
The Mr. Fur Face Contest continues today as one of the longest running beard contests in America. Contestants vie for the title in categories such as:

 Mr. Alaskan Whaler - Beard without a mustache
 Mr. Brown Bear - Brown beard
 Mr. Black Bear - Black beard
 Mr. Honey Bear - Blond beard
 Mr. Mountain Goat - Goatee
 Mr. Polar Bear - White beard
 Mr. Pole Cat - Mixed color beard
 Mr. Ptarmigan - Anything goes
 Mr. Pyrite - Fake beard or mustache
 Mr. Red Fox - Red beard
 Mr. Soup Strainer - Mustache
 Mr. Wolf - Trim, suave beard

The categories are based primarily on facial hair color, but include categories for beard style as well. Three judges choose the winner, but ladies from the audience, affectionately known as the "beard fondlers", are eager to assist in choosing the champion. Each category has a winner and the overall title of Mr. Fur Face is given to the grand champion chosen from the best in each group.

Past champions
If a contestant wins the Overall Title as Mr. Fur Face for three out of five years, then he is able to retire the main trophy and, in doing so, often retires from competing himself. Multiple year winners gain a folklorish type following among many Alaskans. The legendary champions of the contest include David Traver (4X), Robert Crawford (4X), Jim Fisher (4X), John Pex (3X), Earl Carson (3X), Larry Smith (3X), and Warren Kolb (3X).

The newly crowned Mr. Fur Face also becomes the next president of the South Central Alaska Beard and Moustache Club, if he accepts the nomination. If he chooses not to take over the reins of the club, then SCAKBMC members vote for a new president as directed by the club bylaws.

SCAKBMC club members have competed in the World Beard and Moustache Championships in Carson City, Nevada (2003), Berlin, Germany (2005), Brighton, England (2007), Anchorage (2009), and Trondheim, Norway in 2011.

Sponsors
The Miners and Trappers Ball and the Mr. Fur Face contest are put on by volunteers from local Lions Clubs, the SCAKBMC, and other interested parties. All net proceeds from the event go to the charities of the Lions Clubs.

External links
 Alaska Lions Clubs
 Miners and Trappers, Inc
 South Central AK Beard and Moustache Club
 Anchorage Fur Rendezvous

References

 History Channel Webshort
 Anchorage Daily News Listing
 Anchorage Daily News Listing

Facial hair
Competitions
Lions Clubs International